Guslitsa, Guslica, or Guslicy is a region situated in the eastern part of Moscow Oblast.  Guslitsa is famous for it was almost entirely inhabited by the Old Believers, mainly popovtsy (Belokrinitskaya Hierarchy, now — Russian Orthodox Old-Rite Church). Name Guslitsa occurs from the Guslitsa River.

Guslitsa is also well known for its cultural heritage and its home-crafts, mainly hand-written singing books and copper mouldings. Guslitsa has its center in the Rudnya and Ilyinsky Pogost villages.

Nowadays Guslitsa lies almost entirely within Orekhovo-Zuyevsky District of Moscow Oblast.

The regions neighboring Guslitsa (currently also unofficial) were also mainly inhabited by the old believers and were influenced by the Guslitsa culture a lot. Among them are: Ramenye, Zakhod, Zaponorye, Patriarshina, Vokhna.

References 
 Russian: Михайлов С. С. Так что же считать Гуслицами? Альманах "Гуслицы", 2004 .
 Russian: Михайлов С.С., Марков А.П. Старообрядцы Гуслиц .
 Russian:  Агеева Е. А. Гуслица. Альманах "Гуслицы", вып. 5, 2007 .

 
Old Believer communities in Russia
Geography of Moscow Oblast